Among horse-drawn vehicles, a lorry was a low-loading trolley. It was used mainly for the carriage of other vehicles, for example for delivery from the coachbuilders or returning there for repair.

Its very small wheels were mounted under the deck which had to be wider than the track of the vehicles to be carried. It had two ramps, stowed above the back axle and below the body. These were withdrawn from the lorry and one end of each attached to the back of the deck while the other ends rested on the ground. A winch, mounted on the headboard was then used to draw the load up the ramps and onto the deck. The winch cable, low fixed sideboards and a low hinged tailboard plus lashings retained it there. 

The lorry was rather like a wooden version of the modern car-carrying trailer, intended for towing behind a car, except that the wheels were wooden, with iron tyres and were not close-coupled. The front ones were on a steering undercarriage. The driver's seat was mounted on the top of the headboard.

Around 1900, the lorry developed a sturdier form for carrying the heavier motor cars. These motor car lorries were two-horse vehicles, partly because of the weight carried but also because the roll-resistance of the very small wheels had to be overcome. For the same reason, it was primarily an urban vehicle so that, on the paved roads, the small wheels were not an insurmountable handicap. In any case, the axles were sprung.

As in many fields, as time went by, people used the word perhaps without understanding its detailed meaning, so that it became applied less precisely and other configurations were given the name. By 1911, as the motor-propelled lorry (a kind of truck) developed, a pedant would have regarded it as being more the heir of the heavy trolley than of the horse-drawn lorry. However, the railway vehicles, first noted by the Oxford English Dictionary from 1838, were more like the horse-drawn road lorry. In these earlier years, it was also called a lurry. In Britain, "lorry" nowadays means any large powered truck.

See also 
 Horse-drawn vehicle
 Wagon

References 
Ingram, A. Horse-Drawn Vehicles Since 1760 (1977) 
Oxford English Dictionary (1971 & 1987) 
Horse-Drawn Carriages.

External links 
Articles about Horse-drawn Carriages

Wagons
Horse transportation